Brian House (born Denver, Colorado) is a new media and sound artist. House's early projects were formative examples of locative media art and digital media in social practice. His subsequent projects have focused on sound and data sonification in relation to nature and technology. His work has appeared in numerous exhibitions around the world, including at the Museum of Modern Art, the Museum of Contemporary Art, Los Angeles, Ars Electronica and ZKM Center for Art and Media.

Biography
House graduated with a degree in computer science from Columbia University, where he studied at the Computer Music Center. He subsequently received a master's degree from Chalmers tekniska högskola in Gothenburg, Sweden, and was active in the local experimental music scene. House formed the Knifeandfork media art collective in 2004 with classmate Sue Huang and became a member of the psychogeography collective Glowlab on returning to New York City.

Knifeandfork received a 2007 Rhizome commission and were artists-in-residence at the Museum of Contemporary Art in Los Angeles in 2009. House was a resident of Eyebeam Art and Technology Center in 2012 and was concurrently a member of the Research and Development Lab at The New York Times. His work at the Times with personal data was featured in Time magazine.

House earned a PhD at Brown University in 2018, where he studied with Wendy Hui Kyong Chun. He is currently a professor of art at Lewis and Clark College in Portland, Oregon, and is represented by Gallery Nosco in London.

Selected works

Animas (2016)
Animas is a reaction to the 2015 Gold King Mine waste water spill, where three million gallons of contaminated wastewater was released into the Animas River. House made an installation which transforms real-time data from water quality sensors into vibrations that activate metal panels and create an immersive sound environment.

Conversnitch (2013)
House and Kyle McDonald converted light bulbs in public spaces into microphones that automatically tweeted overheard conversations.

Quotidian Record (2012)
Quotidian Record is a vinyl record of one year of House's location data translated into music. One rotation of the record is one day. It comments on the physicality of data and the inherent rhythms of everyday life.

Joyride (2011)
In 2011, House used OpenPaths and Google Street View to track the location of a stolen iPhone and create a re-enactment of the thief's journey.

Trying the Hand of God (2009)
In 2009, House and Huang (as Knifeandfork) were social practice artists-in-residence at MOCA in Los Angeles where they produced several projects. In Trying the Hand of God, they converted the sculpture plaza into a stadium with astroturf, goalposts and bleachers, and filmed 64 versions of Diego Maradona's famous "Hand of God" goal from the 1986 World Cup. Members of the audience played the role of Maradona.

Yellow Arrow (2004)

Yellow Arrow was a street art project using stickers and text-messaging that took place simultaneously in 35 countries. It is an important early example of locative media and mobile phone art and draws concepts from psychogeography.

Yellow Arrow was included in the Design and the Elastic Mind show at MoMA curated by Paola Antonelli.

References

External links
 Brian House's personal website
 Interview with Creative Applications

Modern artists
American digital artists
American sound artists
Living people
Artists from Denver
Columbia University alumni
Brown University alumni
1979 births